Oyratlı is a village in the Besni District, Adıyaman Province, Turkey. Its population is 1,399 (2021).

The hamlet of Satıluşağı is attached to the village.

References

Villages in Besni District